Charles William Britt (born March 20, 1938) is a former American football defensive back in the National Football League (NFL). He was drafted by the Los Angeles Rams in the third round of the 1960 NFL Draft and also played for the Minnesota Vikings and San Francisco 49ers. He played college football at Georgia, where he played quarterback.

During his playing career, Britt appeared in the TV series, The Adventures of Ozzie and Harriet from 1961 to 1965.

References

1938 births
Living people
Players of American football from Augusta, Georgia
Male actors from Georgia (U.S. state)
American football defensive backs
American football quarterbacks
Georgia Bulldogs football players
Los Angeles Rams players
Minnesota Vikings players
San Francisco 49ers players